The surname Healey is used variously in the automotive industry:

People
 Donald Healey (1898–1988), British rally driver & automotive engineer
 Geoffrey Healey (1922–1994), British car designer, son of Donald

Manufacturers
 Donald Healey Motor Company (1946–1953), British car manufacturer founded by Donald Healey in Warwick UK
 Healey (1946–1954) various models using a 2443 cc Riley engine built at Warwick
 Nash-Healey (1951–1954), a joint venture with Nash Motors built with a Nash engine at Warwick and marketed only in USA by Nash
 Austin-Healey (1953–1973), a joint venture with Austin/BMC/Leyland using various Austin engines
 Austin-Healey 100(/4) & 100/6 (1953–56, 1956–1959), produced by BMC and Jensen Motors at West Bromwich UK
 Austin-Healey Sprite (1958–1971), produced by BMC at Abingdon
 Austin-Healey 3000 (1959–1967), produced by BMC and Jensen Motors
 Jensen-Healey (1972–1976), a joint venture with Jensen produced by Jensen Motors
Kit-car
 Hult Healey, Swedish kit-car
See also
 Healey 1000/4 (1971–1977), motorcycle built in Redditch